This list presents the members of the Madrid Municipal Council in the 2015–2019 period, including substitutes:

References